Co-operative Party is a political party in the United Kingdom.

Co-operative Party may also refer to:

 Japan Cooperative Party (1945–46)
 Japan Cooperative Party (1946–47)
 National Cooperative Party, Japan
 New Zealand Co-operative Party
 Democratic Co-operative Party, Namibia
 Nepal Co-operative Party
 Co-operative Commonwealth Federation, Canada
 People's Co-operative Commonwealth Federation, British Columbia, Canada

See also

 
 
 list of co-operatives
 Coop (disambiguation)
 Cooperative (disambiguation)